The Wildlife Reserve in Al Wusta, formerly the Arabian Oryx Sanctuary, is a nature reserve in the Omani Central Desert and Coastal Hills. It was included in the UNESCO World Heritage list, but became the first site to be removed from the World Heritage list in 2007.

Species inhabiting the reserve include the mountain gazelle, Nubian ibex, Arabian wolf, honey badger and caracal.

On June 28, 2007, the reserve was removed from the World Heritage Site register. UNESCO cited Oman's decision to reduce the site by 90% after oil had been found at the site, and the decline of the population of Arabian oryx from 450 in 1996 to 65 in 2007 as a result of poaching and habitat destruction. At that time, only four mating pairs remained.

References

Former World Heritage Sites
Wildlife sanctuaries of Asia
Animal reintroduction
Protected areas of Oman